Bagh Bid (also Romanized as Bāgh Bīd, Bāgh-i-Bīd, and Bāghbīd) is a village in Sakhvid Rural District, Nir District, Taft County, Yazd Province, Iran. At the 2006 census, its population was 106, in 37 families.

References 

Populated places in Taft County